Macedonians in Greece may refer to:

Macedonians (Greeks),regional and historical population group of ethnic Greeks, inhabiting or originating from the Greek region of Macedonia, in Northern Greece.
For what is termed ethnic Macedonians in Greece, see the article about the minority of Slavic-speakers of Greek Macedonia